The Cape York Peninsula tropical savanna is a tropical grasslands, savannas, and shrublands ecoregion in northern Australia. It occupies the Cape York Peninsula in Queensland, mainland Australia's northernmost point. It is coterminous with the Cape York Peninsula (code CYP), an interim Australian bioregion.

Geography
The ecoregion covers the northern portion of the Cape York Peninsula, along with the adjacent Torres Strait Islands. It is bounded by the Carpentaria tropical savanna ecoregion to the southwest, Einasleigh Uplands savanna to the south, and Queensland tropical rain forests to the southeast.

The west of the region is dominated in the south by an extensive Tertiary sand sheet dissected by the drainage systems of the Holroyd Plain, the Tertiary laterite of the Weipa Plateau, and the low rises of Mesozoic sandstones, while the northern section consists of the Weipa Plateau together with extensive coastal plains along the Gulf of Carpentaria. To the east lie aeolian dunefields. Along the eastern margin, the geology of the Coen-Yambo Inlier is complex, with volcanic, metamorphic and acid intrusive rocks. The subregion of the Battle Camp Sandstones, formed from deeply dissected plateaus, lies in the south of the region, with the Laura Lowlands, composed of sands and silts, and colluvial and alluvial clays, lying adjacent.

Climate
The climate is tropical, humid or maritime, with rainfall varying from 1000 mm to 1600 mm, including some high-rainfall areas at high elevations.

Flora
The vegetation mainly consists of woodlands, heathlands, sedgelands, vine forests (including both semi-deciduous vine forests on the eastern ranges and deciduous vine thickets on western slopes). Mangrove forests are found in the north east and along the estuaries on the coasts.

Subregions
In the IBRA system, Cape York Peninsula (CYP) has nine sub-regions:

Protected areas
Protected areas in the ecoregion include Alwal National Park, Binirr National Park, Cape Melville National Park, Muundhi National Park, Apudthama National Park, Kulla National Park, Rinyirru National Park, Olkola National Park, Oyala Thumotang National Park, and Wuthathi (Shelburne Bay) National Park.

External links

References

Ecoregions of Queensland
IBRA regions
Tropical and subtropical grasslands, savannas, and shrublands
Endemic Bird Areas